James Anthony Pearson (born 1 October 1989 in Rochdale, Greater Manchester) is a British actor who lives in Glasgow.

Pearson is best known for his performance as Bernard Sumner in Anton Corbijn's film Control. He  played the role of Angus Stewart in 5th series of BBC's Monarch of the Glen. 
He also stars in the 2009 British film New Town Killers, an action thriller for which Pearson performed most of his own stunts. Pearson first appeared on TV in the BAFTA Award-winning BBC TV series Jeopardy playing the central role of Simon. It ran for three series, with a total of 40 episodes. He also starred as Ed MacKenzie in the BBC Three drama Lip Service.

He stars in the music video for "Come Monday Night", the first single from Stuart Murdoch's project God Help the Girl.

Radio

References

External links
 

British male radio actors
Living people
Actors from Rochdale
British male television actors
1989 births